In Too Deep is a 1999 American crime thriller film directed by Michael Rymer from a screenplay written by Michael Henry Brown and Paul Aaron. The film stars Omar Epps, LL Cool J, Nia Long, Stanley Tucci, Hill Harper and Pam Grier.

Plot
Jeffrey Cole (Omar Epps) is a recent graduate of the Cincinnati police academy who dreams of working undercover. Cole manages to get an undercover assignment the day of graduation and earns the praise of his superiors. He is soon given the task of taking down statewide crack dealer Dwayne Gittens (LL Cool J), an underworld boss so powerful that his nickname is "God".

Cole goes undercover, posing as a drug dealer under the name of J. Reid from Akron, Ohio. Cole has to prove he has street cred to gain a place in God's crew. At one point God sends Cole out on a mission with a couple of his cohorts with the intention of Cole killing a man that God wants dead. Cole chases the target but intentionally missed his shots.

The crew believe he's loyal, but has bad aim. Cole eventually becomes close with one of the members of Gittens' crew, Breezy T. (Hill Harper).

Cole's superiors are impressed at his undercover work and how close he has gotten to Gittens, earning his trust while providing his superiors with intricate details into the organization. Cole's superior, Preston D'Ambrosio (Stanley Tucci) worries that the line between cop and bad guy is getting blurred and that both identities are becoming one. D'Ambrosio places Cole on forced hiatus from undercover and sends him to a place in the woods far from the city to get his head straight and re-discover himself.

During that time, Cole meets Myra (Nia Long), an aspiring model during one of Cole's photography classes. The two eventually begin dating and D'Ambrosio begins to take notice of his new life away from undercover work. Cole tries to convince D'Ambrosio to let him go back undercover in the Gittens case, to no avail.

D'Ambrosio is eventually overruled by District Attorney Daniel Connelly (Jake Weber) and DEA agent Rick Scott (David Patrick Kelly), reasoning that Cole is the only undercover cop to infiltrate Gittens crew as deep as he has, and Cole is the person who can bring down Gittens' organization. Cole is then reassigned to the Gittens case. Myra, realizing that he has to go back undercover, begins to distance herself from Cole.

Cole starts to see Gittens becoming unhinged and his sporadic violence in the community, going as far as torturing, then later killing his second in command for making a pass at his baby's mother. The ruthlessness starts to get to Cole, as he dives deeper into his J. Reid cover.

D'Ambrosio wants to pull Cole out of undercover again, as he sees his officer becoming unhinged and becoming J. Reid. Connelly and Scott disagree, and they come up with a sting to bust Gittens meeting with his suppliers. A gunfight ensues when police arrive to arrest Gittens and the suppliers. Gittens advises his crew to lower their weapons and surrender.

Cole shields Gittens from police and a standoff ensues between the officers and an unhinged Cole, struggling between his loyalties. Realizing he is losing himself, Det. Angela Wilson (Pam Grier) talks him down and reminds him that he is Jeffrey Cole, not J. Reid, and to lower his weapon.

As Gittens is being read his Miranda rights, Scott requests Cole to bring Gittens in. During trial, Cole testifies against Gittens and his organization. Cole puts in a good word for Breezy T., helping him reduce his sentence. Because of the evidence against him and Cole's testimony, Gittens is convicted and sentenced. Gittens and Cole share a final glance before Gittens is taken away.

As Connelly and Scott hold a press conference for the conviction of Gittens, Cole and Myra are driving and listening to the press conference. Cole switches off the radio, while Myra reminds Cole that his undercover work was the sole reason Gittens is behind bars. The last scenes are shown where Cole is teaching new young officers about undercover work, and the importance to never lose their cover or get too deep.

Cast

Reception
The movie received mixed reviews.

Box office
The movie recouped its budget at the box office making 14 million from its 7 million budget.

Soundtrack

A soundtrack containing hip hop music was released on August 24, 1999, by Columbia Records. It made it to No. 28 on the Billboard 200 and No. 8 on the Top R&B/Hip-Hop Albums and featured 50 Cent's debut single, "How to Rob".

Score
Varèse Sarabande issued an album of Christopher Young's score for the film on September 21, 1999. Young was very displeased with the album.

Track listing 

In 2008, Christopher Young personally rearranged the score into a promotional album that he produced. The album contains the song "Give me a reason" performed by Dave Hollister. About the final product, Young said: "Thanks for giving it another shot. At long last I think I can finally live with this score".

Track listing

See also 
 List of hood films

References

External links
 

1999 films
1999 crime drama films
1999 crime thriller films
American crime drama films
American crime thriller films
American thriller drama films
African-American films
Dimension Films films
Films scored by Christopher Young
Films directed by Michael Rymer
Films set in Cincinnati
American gang films
Hood films
American police detective films
Miramax films
African-American drama films
1990s English-language films
1990s American films